Phillip Morris Odel (November 23, 1942 - July 27, 2006) was an American football wide receiver who played in the National Football League for the Detroit Lions from 1968 to 1970.

References

1942 births
1996 deaths
Detroit Lions players
American football wide receivers